Transportes del Nazas is a Torreón, Coahuila, Mexico bus line. It has 104 units, which are called rojos (reds).

Routes

Torreón-Gómez-Cumbres

This route has the main destination Cumbres suburb in Lerdo City, then, the J. Agustín Castro road in Gómez Palacio, and exit for the Hidalgo Avenue in such city, and for go to Torreon goes for the Miguel Aleman Blvd., and then, Torreon downtown, and return to Gómez Palacio for the Constitución Boulevard and turns along the Victoria Avenue.

Torreón-Gómez-Chapala

This route has certain modification, the main destination is Chapala suburb in Gómez Palacio, but in Early-2000s goes to Refugio and Alamos suburbs in northern Gomez Palacio and currently El Dorado suburbs in the same city, but the enter to Torreón is the same of Torreón-Gómez-Cumbres, with a difference from Torreón-Gómez-Cumbres that turns along the Mina Avenue.

Directo

This is the only route that cover three sister cities, it exits from the Victoria Park in Lerdo, Durango, and turns for the Miguel Alemán Boulevard, and enters to Torreón just like Torreón-Gómez-Cumbres and Torreón-Gómez-Chapala, and returns to Lerdo for All Miguel Alemán Boulevard and enters to Lerdo Downtown for the Matamoros Avenue.

Gómez-Lerdo

This is the only route that not cover Torreón city, It exits just like Directo, and enters to downtown Gómez Palacio just like Torreón-Gómez-Cumbres, the return way is just like Torreón-Gómez-Cumbres, and way to Lerdo is just like Directo. Has various destinations: Chilchota Alimentos, Chapala suburb, Gómez Palacio municipal market, Telmex and Gómez Palacio Industrial Park.

See also 
Transportes Moctezuma de la Laguna

Bus companies of Mexico